Jerry Smit (born 22 September 1969) is an Italian equestrian. He competed at the 1992 Summer Olympics, the 1996 Summer Olympics and the 2000 Summer Olympics.

References

External links
 

1969 births
Living people
Italian male equestrians
Olympic equestrians of Italy
Equestrians at the 1992 Summer Olympics
Equestrians at the 1996 Summer Olympics
Equestrians at the 2000 Summer Olympics
Sportspeople from Milan